Cicindela hybrida, also known as the northern dune tiger beetle, has a wide distribution in the Palaearctic region. Cicindela hybrida hybrida is common in Central Europe, even in artificial habitats.

The species is divided into the following subspecies:
 Cicindela hybrida hybrida Linnaeus, 1758
 Cicindela hybrida kozhantshikovi Lutshnik, 1924
 Cicindela hybrida magyarica Roeschke, 1891

 Cicindela hybrida pseudoriparia Mandl, 1935 
 Cicindela hybrida transversalis Dejean, 1822

References

Gallery

External links 
Picture story about the biology of the Northern Dune Tiger Beetle Cicindela hybrida

hybrida
Beetles described in 1758
Taxa named by Carl Linnaeus